The Periá River is a river of Maranhão state in northeastern Brazil. It flows into the Atlantic Ocean at the border between Humberto de Campos and Primeira Cruz municipalities.

See also
List of rivers of Maranhão

References
Brazilian Ministry of Transport

Rivers of Maranhão